The 2013 Sport 1 Open was a professional tennis tournament played on clay courts. It was the 21st edition of the tournament which was part of the 2013 ATP Challenger Tour. It took place in Scheveningen, Netherlands, between 8 and 15 July 2013.

Singles main draw entrants

Seeds

 1 Rankings are as of June 24, 2013.

Other entrants
The following players received wildcards into the singles main draw:
  Stephan Fransen
  Mark de Jong
  Thomas Schoorel
  Nick van der Meer

The following players received special exempt into the singles main draw:
  Miljan Zekić

The following players received entry from the qualifying draw:
  Colin Ebelthite
  Lorenzo Giustino
  Andis Juška
  Thiago Monteiro

The following player received entry as a lucky loser:
  Roberto Carballés Baena

Champions

Singles

 Jesse Huta Galung def.  Robin Haase 6–3, 6–7(2–7), 6–4

Doubles

  Antal van der Duim /  Boy Westerhof def.  Gero Kretschmer /  Alexander Satschko 6–3, 6–3

External links
Official Website

Sport 1 Open
2013
2013 in Dutch tennis